Alkalihalobacillus miscanthi is a Gram-positive, aerobic, endospore-forming and rod-shaped bacterium from the genus of Alkalihalobacillus which has been isolated from the rhizosphere of the grass Miscanthus sacchariflorus.

References

Bacillaceae
Bacteria described in 2020